Kotlarczyk is a Polish-language surname derived from the occupation kotlar, tinker/tinsmith, similar to the surname Calderon.

The surname may refer to:
Mieczysław Kotlarczyk (1908-1978), Polish actor
Józef Kotlarczyk (1907-1959), Polish footballer
Teresa Kotlarczyk (born 1955), Polish film director

Occupational surnames
Polish-language surnames